Zhou Yi (born July 20, 1983 in Chengdu, Sichuan) is a Chinese softball player who competed at the 2004 Summer Olympics.

In the 2004 Olympic softball competition she finished fourth with the Chinese team. She played all eight matches as outfielder.

External links
Profile at Yahoo! Sports (archive)

1983 births
Living people
Chinese softball players
Olympic softball players of China
Sportspeople from Chengdu
Softball players at the 2004 Summer Olympics
Softball players at the 2008 Summer Olympics
Asian Games medalists in softball
Sportspeople from Sichuan
Softball players at the 2010 Asian Games
Softball players at the 2006 Asian Games
Softball players at the 2002 Asian Games
Asian Games silver medalists for China
Asian Games bronze medalists for China
Medalists at the 2002 Asian Games
Medalists at the 2006 Asian Games
Medalists at the 2010 Asian Games